Halgerda albocristata is a species of sea slug, a dorid nudibranch, a shell-less marine gastropod mollusk in the family Discodorididae.

Distribution
The holotype of this species was collected at Bonito Island, Batangas, Philippines. Additional material in the original description includes specimens from Okinawa and Sulawesi, Indonesia. Subsequently reported from Heron Island, Great Barrier Reef, Queensland and the Marianas Islands.

References

Discodorididae
Gastropods described in 1998